Pervomaiskoe (until 1944, Curçı) is an urban-type settlement in Ukraine. The town also serves as the administrative center of the Pervomaiske Raion (district), housing the district's local administration buildings.

As of the 2001 Ukrainian Census, its population was 9,384. Current population:

References

Urban-type settlements in Crimea
Pervomaiske Raion